Matsuri (also known as Matsurdi, Matšuri, Belohvostovo and Piiroja) is a village in Setomaa Parish, Võru County, in southeastern Estonia, on the border with Russia. The Tartu–Pechory, Valga–Pechory railways and Karisilla–Pechory road (nr. 63) all pass Matsuri and cross the border in neighbouring Koidula. In 2011, a new Koidula railway station was built on the territory of Matsuri to enable traffic between Tartu–Pechory and Valga–Pechory railways while avoiding crossing the Russian border.

Matsuri has a population of 42 (as of 1 January 2011).

In 2008 a new Matsuri–Sesniki road was opened, making it possible to reach Saatse and its neighbouring villages without necessarily passing through the Saatse Boot.

References

Villages in Võru County